Apprieu is a commune in the Isère department in the Auvergne-Rhône-Alpes region of southeastern France.

The inhabitants of the commune are known as Apprelans or Apprelanes.

Geography
Apprieu is located some 60 km east by south-east of Vienne and 12 km north-west of Voiron stretching along the southern slope of a hill originating from a moraine of Alpine glaciers from the last ice age. Access to the commune is by road D520 from Colombe in the west passing through the town and continuing east to La Murette. The A48 autoroute passes through the southern tip of the commune but has no exit until Exit 9 just to the west of the commune. Apart from the town there are also the hamlets of Plan Bois in the north-east and Le Rivier in the south. The commune north of the town is heavily forested while to the south is mostly farmland with forests to a lesser extent.

The Fure river follows the eastern and southern borders of the commune then flows south to join the Morge river at Le Port.

Neighbouring communes and villages

History
Apprieu, from the Latin Apprius - an anagram of "Priapus", the ancient god of fertility associated with the ancient city of Lampsacus near Troy.

Heraldry

Administration

List of Successive Mayors

Demography
In 2017 the commune had 3,313 inhabitants.

Sites and Monuments

The Forges of Bonpertuis (1859) are registered as an historical monument.

Notable people linked to the commune
The Gourju family settled in Apprieu in 1842 to restart the old forges of Bonpertuis known since 1569 and probably much earlier in the Carthusian period. Alphonse Gourju (ironmaster from Rives), Renage, and Brignoud from the valley of Gresivaudan installed a remarkable puddling furnace at Bonpertuis which is well preserved today. The tradition of ironworking was continued by the Experton family.

Canadian biathlete Yolaine Oddou emigrated to Canada from Apprieu in 1999.

See also
Communes of the Isère department

References

External links

Apprieu official website 
Apprieu on Géoportail, National Geographic Institute (IGN) website 
Aprieu on the 1750 Cassini Map

Communes of Isère
Dauphiné